Dicranucha strepsigramma is a moth of the family Gelechiidae. It was described by Edward Meyrick in 1937. It is found in South Africa.

References

Endemic moths of South Africa
Moths described in 1937
Dicranucha
Taxa named by Edward Meyrick